Translational Research: The Journal of Laboratory and Clinical Medicine is a monthly peer-reviewed medical journal covering translational research. It was established in 1915 as The Journal of Laboratory and Clinical Medicine obtaining its current title in 2006. Jeffrey Laurence (Weill Cornell Medical College) has been editor-in-chief since 2006. He was preceded by Dale Hammerschmidt. It is the official journal of the Central Society for Clinical and Translational Research. It is published by Mosby.

Abstracting and indexing
The journal is abstracted and indexed in:

According to the Journal Citation Reports, the journal has a 2014 impact factor of 5.03, ranking it second out of 30 journals in the category "Medical Laboratory Technology", 17th out of 153 journals in the category "Medicine, General & Internal" and 17th out of 123 journals in the category "Medicine, Research & Experimental"

References

Further reading

External links

Central Society for Clinical and Translational Research

Publications established in 1915
Translational medicine
Clinical medicine
General medical journals
English-language journals
Mosby academic journals